The Chamberlain-Kay House is located in Belton, a city in Anderson County, South Carolina. The house was built around 1854 as a residence for Charles C. Chamberlain. Chamberlain was the first supervisor of the rail line from Belton to Greenville. The home is believed to be one of the oldest residences in Belton. Many changes have been made to the home over the years, creating a rather amalgamated if not historically diluted building. The home was listed in the National Historic Register on November 25, 1980.

References

Houses on the National Register of Historic Places in South Carolina
Greek Revival houses in South Carolina
Queen Anne architecture in South Carolina
Houses completed in 1922
Houses in Anderson County, South Carolina
National Register of Historic Places in Anderson County, South Carolina